Dora Thewlis (1890–1976) was a British suffragette whose arrest picture made the front page of the Daily Mirror and other press.

Early life 
Dora was born on 15 May 1890, at Shady Row in Meltham Mills, near Huddersfield in the West Riding of Yorkshire in 1890. She was one of seven children born to James and Eliza Thewlis, who was from Woodbridge, Suffolk. At the time James was working locally as a weaver. And Dora worked in a Yorkshire mill as a teen.

As a suffragette
Thewlis was sixteen when she joined the Women's Social and Political Union in 1907. She was arrested the same year, having been part of a planned break in into the Houses of Parliament, when seventy-five women were arrested. She was patronised by the judge at her court appearance, and implied she had been going to London for immoral purposes. She was labelled the 'Baby Suffragette'  and the 'little mill hand' by the press. She appeared on the front page of the Daily Mirror (picture to the right) after the event, with the caption "Suffragettes storm the House,"`and called 'girl suffragist' in The Daily Chronicle or 'infant agitator' in The Times. This kind of adverse publicity was not welcomed by the suffrage movement. 

The judge suggested her parents might take her in hand and sort her out. Their reply was she was her own person and they fully supported her. The family were socialists and her mother Eliza was quoted in the Huddersfield Weekly Examiner as saying that she had brought Dora up to read newspapers since the age of 7 and to debate politics. The family had also supported Mrs Pankhurst at the local by-election. Dora's sentence was two weeks in prison, but she served one. On her departure escorted by a wardress, she met with Edith How-Martyn.  

Thewlis emigrated to Australia before the start of the First World War, therefore never seeing the passage of women's suffrage in England, and in 1918 she married Jack Dow, who predeceased her in 1956, she died in 1976.

See also 

 Women's suffrage in the United Kingdom
 Women's Social and Political Union
 List of suffragists and suffragettes

Further reading 
 Liddington, Jill: Rebel Girls: their fight for the vote (Virago Press, 2006)
 My true story: Give Us The Vote! by Sue Reid
Press coverage https://huddersfield.exposed/wiki/Category:Articles_about_Dora_Thewlis_(1890-1976)

References

English suffragists
English emigrants to Australia
People from Honley
1890 births
1976 deaths
Women's Social and Political Union